Namibia competed at the World Games 2017 in Wroclaw, Poland, from 20 July 2017 to 30 July 2017.

Competitors

Archery
Namibia  has qualified at the 2017 World Games 2 athletes.

References 

Namibia
2017 in Namibian sport
2017